Loops from the Bergerie is an album by the group Swayzak.  The title of this album comes from the soundtrack for the sixties French movie Les Loups Dans La Bergerie.

Track listing 
"Keep it Coming" - 5:14
"Another Way" - 5:33
"Bergerie" - 4:55
"My House" - 4:22
"Jeune Loup" - 5:57
"Snowblind" - 5:04
"Then There's Her" - 5:38
"8080" - 7:35
"Speakeasy" - 4:11
"The Long Night" - 5:07

Citations and references

External links
 Official website discography

2004 albums
Swayzak albums